AWAS Aviation Capital Ltd. is one of the top ten largest aircraft leasing companies in the world. Headquartered in Dublin, with offices in New York City, Miami and Singapore, AWAS employs 100 professionals.  

AWAS owns a fleet of over 250 commercial aircraft, primarily Airbus and Boeing types, which it leases to more than 100 airlines worldwide.

Founded in 1985 as Ansett Worldwide Aviation Services, the company officially changed its name to AWAS in 2004. 

AWAS was acquired in 2006 by Terra Firma Funds. In 2007, AWAS acquired the San Francisco based Pegasus Aviation Finance Company, one of the world's largest commercial aircraft lessor which had formed in 1998 and had a fleet of over 200 aircraft, and combined the two companies.

References

External links 
 Official site

Aircraft leasing companies